Borzolabad (also Romanized as Borzolābād, Borzīlābād, and Burzilābād) is a village in Howmeh Rural District, in the Central District of Shirvan County, North Khorasan Province, Iran. At the 2006 census, its population was 601, in 159 families.

References 

Populated places in Shirvan County